Ashley Marie Grove (born November 20, 1990) is an American soccer player. She played as a midfielder for Herforder SV.

Club career 
She played for Western New York Flash and Boston Breakers before moving to Herforder SV on September 5, 2014.

Honours 
Western New York Flash
Runner-up
 National Women's Soccer League: 2013

References

External links 
 
 Profile at soccerdonna.de 

1990 births
Living people
National Women's Soccer League players
Western New York Flash players
Boston Breakers players
American women's soccer players
Maryland Terrapins women's soccer players
American expatriate soccer players in Germany
Women's association football midfielders
American expatriate women's soccer players